Andrea Green may refer to:

Andrea Green, British soap actress
Andrea Green (athlete) (born 1968), English long-distance runner
Andrea Green (sitting volleyball) (born 1970), British sitting volleyball player